The 2015 WTA Premier tournaments are 21 of the tennis tournaments on the 2015 WTA Tour. The WTA Tour is the elite tour for women's professional tennis. The WTA Premier tournaments are divided into three levels, which all rank below the Grand Slam events and above the WTA International tournaments.

Schedule

Premier

WTA Premier tournaments
WTA Premier tournaments seasons